Glenrothes RFC or "The Glens" are a rugby union club based in Glenrothes, Fife, Scotland. Home matches are played at Carleton Park, Glenrothes.

History

Founded in 1965, the club recently celebrated their 50th anniversary.

Glenrothes currently competes in Caledonia Regional League Division One.

Glenrothes Sevens

The club run the Glenrothes Sevens tournament.

New Town Sevens

This Sevens tournament was peripatetic around the new towns of Scotland:- East Kilbride, Glenrothes, Cumbernauld, Livingston and Irvine. The town's rugby clubs of East Kilbride RFC, Glenrothes RFC, Cumbernauld RFC, Livingston RFC and Irvine RFC would play in a Sevens tournament to become the New Town Sevens Champions and the Scottish New Towns Cup.

Honours

 Glenrothes Sevens
 Champions: 1981, 1982, 1984, 1995
 Strathmore Sevens
 Champions: 1977
 New Towns Sevens
 Champions: 1972, 1974, 1976, 1978
 Dumbarton Sevens
 Champions: 1991
 Waid Academy F.P. Sevens
 Champions: 1976, 1979, 1987
 Alloa Sevens
 Champions: 1991
 Midlands District Sevens
 Champions: 1977, 1978, 1981, 1982
 Kirkcaldy Sevens
 Champions: 1978, 1979, 1983
 Howe of Fife Sevens
 Champions: 1976, 1978, 2000

Notable former players

British and Irish Lions

 Iain Paxton

Scotland internationalists

 Dave McIvor
 Iain Paxton

Caledonia Reds players

 Dave McIvor
 Jonathan Goldie

Edinburgh Rugby players

 Sean Crombie
 Dave Young

See also
 Dunfermline RFC
 Howe of Fife RFC
 Kirkcaldy RFC

References

Bibliography

 Massie, Allan A Portrait of Scottish Rugby (Polygon, Edinburgh)

External links
 Club website
 
 

Scottish rugby union teams
Rugby union in Fife
Rugby clubs established in 1965
1965 establishments in Scotland
Glenrothes